Francis T. Borkowski is an American former university professor, chancellor, and university president. Before holding administrative positions, he was a musician and conductor.

Early life
Borkowski was born in Wheeling, West Virginia.  Both his parents were the children of Polish immigrants.  He and his family later moved to Steubenville, Ohio, where he attended Steubenville Catholic Central High School. He was among the first in his family to finish high school.

Career

Music
He started playing the accordion at age nine, often performing at events in his community. In high school, he took classes in music and music theory. He attended Oberlin College from 1953 to 1957, earning a Bachelor of Science in Music Education. First, he planned on teaching music at the high-school level; however, mid-way through college he discovered his love of playing while studying with Reginald Kell. Then he began dedicating himself to the clarinet, with the hope of playing professionally. After Oberlin College he attended Indiana University (IU) to complete a M.A. degree. In December 1957, he began playing for the Indianapolis Symphony Orchestra while still attending IU. In 1959 he resigned from the Orchestra and joined the Jacksonville Symphony Orchestra along with his wife. After spending two years in Jacksonville, in 1961, he decided to attend West Virginia University to pursue a Ph.D in music education with a minor in musicology. He became a member of the national music fraternity, Phi Mu Alpha Sinfonia in 1963. While pursuing his doctorate he taught the university's marching band, working with the concert band, and taught clarinet. He completed the doctorate in 1967.

Administration experiences

Ohio University
In 1967, Borkowski became a faculty member at Ohio University in Athens, Ohio. He taught music classes and conducted research. The next year he was elected to the faculty senate and later was chosen to serve as the assistant director of the School of Music. In 1970 he joined the academic area staff, the position of Assistant Dean of Faculties. A few years later he was appointed the Associate Dean of Faculties.

Purdue University
After Borkowski's tenure with Ohio, he was appointed the first vice chancellor at Purdue University in West Lafayette, Indiana. He was also Dean of Faculties for some time.

South Carolina University
In 1978, he was appointed Provost at South Carolina University in Columbia, South Carolina. He was also Executive Vice-President for some time.

University of South Florida
Borkowski was nominated for president at University of South Florida (USF) by a librarian. Several things compelled him to apply for president: the appearance of the campus, many opportunities, the status of being a young university with little tradition, and the university's fine arts program. After he applied, he was interviewed by a chancellor and got the job. He became the seventh president of the University of South Florida in 1988. During his tenure he had many goals: make USF a top twenty-five public university in the country, improve the College of Public Health and University of South Florida College of Medicine.  During his tenure, he also sought to bring what were ultimately criminal theft charges against the student Petr Taborsky who had invented a novel clay material that could absorb ammonia and other toxic substances.  The path to take a criminal as opposed to a civil action against the student has been widely criticized

Appalachian State University
In 1993, Borkowski was appointed Appalachian State University's fifth chancellor. During his tenure he expanded the University's outreach program. Holmes Convocation Center, a science building, was built during his time at Appalachian State. Though the university had improvements, there was controversy over some of the actions executed by Borkowski. Between 1995 and 1997, many rapes occurred on campus, and some blamed Borkowski for weak leadership and failure to punish perpetrators vigorously. Similar questions had been raised about his time at the University of South Florida, where a star basketball player avoided punishment despite reports that he had raped and/or sexually assaulted six women over the course of some months. The athlete did not receive any punishment and was still eligible to play in 1989 and 1990. In 2002, he designated an area on campus a "free-speech-zone," which was created in response to students protesting American foreign policy. Foundation for Individual Rights in Education (FIRE), a civil liberties group, questioned the constitutionality of the zone. In response to FIRE, ASU limited its "free-speech-zone" acts. ASU He resigned as chancellor in June 2003.

Personal life
Borkowski met his wife, Kay, at IU. They married in 1959.

See also
List of Purdue University people

References

External links
Francis Borkowski interview - Scholar Commons 

Living people
Presidents of the University of South Florida
Musicians from Wheeling, West Virginia
People from Steubenville, Ohio
Ohio University faculty
Purdue University faculty
Appalachian State University
American clarinetists
Oberlin College alumni
Indiana University alumni
West Virginia University alumni
21st-century clarinetists
Year of birth missing (living people)